Phyllanthus cuscutiflorus is a species of shrub native to Australia.

References

cuscutiflorus